Vitaliy Olehovych Dakhnovskyi (born 10 February 1999) is a Ukrainian professional football midfielder playing for Veres Rivne.

Club career 
The 2019–20 season Vitaliy Dakhnovskyi spent in Poland playing for amateur Cosmos Nowotaniec and then the fourth tier Wisla Sandomierz.

On 23 August 2020 he signed for Ukrainian First League club Veres Rivne.

In June 2021 Dakhnovskyi was selected as a player of the month in the Ukrainian First League.

References

External links
 
 
 

1999 births
Living people
Ukrainian footballers
Association football midfielders
FC Lviv players
NK Veres Rivne players
Ukrainian Premier League players
Ukrainian First League players
Ukrainian Second League players
Ukrainian Amateur Football Championship players
Ukrainian expatriate footballers
Expatriate footballers in Poland
Ukrainian expatriate sportspeople in Poland
Sportspeople from Lviv Oblast